Invaders is a compilation album released by Kemado Records in 2006. The compilation contains many bands that are signed to the label as well as others bands in a similar classic/traditional hard rock/heavy metal vein. Some songs may have been unreleased or hard to find prior to the compilation.

Track listing
Saviours - "Circle of Servants Bodies"
Danava - "By the Mark"
Big Business - "As the Day Was Dawning"
Black Mountain - "Behind the Fall"
The Sword - "Under the Boughs"
Dungen - "Christopher"
Witch - "Rip Van Winkle"
The Fucking Champs - "The Loge"
Torche - "Mentor"
Pelican - "Ran Amber"
High on Fire - "Devilution (Radio Edit)"
Witchcraft - "Queen of Bees (Live)"
Comets on Fire - "Wolf Eyes (Middle Version)"
Diamond Nights - "12 Walls"
Wolfmother - "Love Train"
Night After Night - "Backseat Astronaut"
Warhammer 48k - "Get Bodacious"
Parchman Farm - "Curtis Franklin"

External links
 Kemado Records

2006 compilation albums